Hermann Tomasgaard (born 4 January 1994) is a Norwegian competitive sailor, born in Lørenskog. He qualified to represent Norway at the 2020 Summer Olympics in Tokyo 2021, winning a bronze medal in Laser.

References

External links
 
 
 

1994 births
Living people
People from Lørenskog
Norwegian male sailors (sport)
Olympic sailors of Norway
Sailors at the 2020 Summer Olympics – Laser
Medalists at the 2020 Summer Olympics
Olympic bronze medalists for Norway
Olympic medalists in sailing
Sportspeople from Viken (county)